Clinton Shaw (born 5 May 1976) is a former Australian rules footballer who played for St Kilda in the Australian Football League (AFL) in 1994. He was recruited from the Southern Stingrays in the TAC Cup with the 25th selection in the 1993 AFL Draft.

References

External links

Living people
1976 births
St Kilda Football Club players
Dandenong Stingrays players
Australian rules footballers from Victoria (Australia)